The Old Curiosity Shop is a nine part 1979 BBC TV series based on the 1841 novel by Charles Dickens. It was directed by Julian Amyes, and adapted by William Trevor.

Cast 
Natalie Ogle - Little Nell
Trevor Peacock - Daniel Quilp
Sebastian Shaw - Grandfather
Granville Saxton - Dick Swiveller
Christopher Fairbank - Kit Nubbles
Colin Jeavons - Sampson Brass
Wensley Pithey - Single Gentleman
Freda Dowie - Sally Brass
Laurence Hardy - Mr. Witherden
Keith Hazemore - Abel Garland
Sandra Payne - Mrs Quilp
Patsy Byrne - Mrs. Nubbles
Simon Garstang - Little Jacob
Annabelle Lanyon - Small Servant
Brian Oulton - The schoolmaster
Donald Bisset - Mr. Garland
Margaret Courtenay - Mrs. Jarley

References

External links 

1979 British television series debuts
1980 British television series endings
1970s British drama television series
1980s British drama television series
BBC television dramas
Period television series
1970s British television miniseries
Television series set in the 19th century
English-language television shows
Television shows based on works by Charles Dickens
The Old Curiosity Shop
1980s British television miniseries